The athletics competition at the 1999 Pan American Games was held at University Stadium in Winnipeg, Manitoba, Canada. Two new events were introduced for women: pole vault and hammer throw. In addition the 20 km road walk replaced the 10,000 m track walk.

Men's results

Track

Field

Women's results

Track

Field

Medal table

Participating nations

See also
1999 in athletics (track and field)

References
Full results at athletics.ca (Internet Archive)
GBR Athletics

 
1999
Pan American Games
Events at the 1999 Pan American Games
1999 Pan American Games